= Surgical and Radiologic Anatomy =

- Discipline: Anatomy and morphology
- Language: English
- Edited by: Bruno Grignon and Fabrice Duparc

Publication details
- History: 1978-present
- Publisher: Springer (Germany)
- Frequency: 10/year
- Impact factor: 1.2 (2023)

Standard abbreviations
- ISO 4: Surg. Radiol. Anat.

Indexing
- CODEN: SRANEM
- ISSN: 0930-1038 (print); 1279-8517 (web)
- OCLC no.: 14037082

Links
- Journal homepage

Surgical and Radiologic Anatomy is a peer-reviewed medical journal that publishes original research and review articles on the bases of medical, surgical and radiologic anatomy. According to the Journal Citation Reports, it has a current impact factor of 1.2, ranking it 13th out of 20 journals in the category "Anatomy & Morphology". It ranked 116th out of 135 categorized under "Surgery".
